Aleksandar Tasić (born 6 April 1988) is a Serbian professional footballer.

References

1988 births
Living people
Serbian footballers
Serbian expatriate footballers
Association football defenders
FK Obilić players
FK Šumadija Aranđelovac players
FK Dinamo Vranje players
FK Mladi Radnik players
FK Smederevo players
FC Le Mont players
FK Novi Pazar players
KF Tërbuni Pukë players
FC Alashkert players
Speranța Nisporeni players
OFK Bačka players
FK Zlatibor Čajetina players
Vasalunds IF players
OFK Žarkovo players
Armenian Premier League players
Kategoria Superiore players
Serbian First League players
Serbian SuperLiga players
Swiss Challenge League players
Moldovan Super Liga players
Ettan Fotboll players
Serbian expatriate sportspeople in Albania
Expatriate footballers in Albania
Serbian expatriate sportspeople in Switzerland
Expatriate footballers in Switzerland
Serbian expatriate sportspeople in Armenia
Expatriate footballers in Armenia
Serbian expatriate sportspeople in Sweden
Expatriate footballers in Sweden
Serbian expatriate sportspeople in Moldova
Expatriate footballers in Moldova